Hindu University of America  is an unaccredited U.S. higher education institution based in Orlando, Florida.

History

The university was inspired by Swami Tilak of Brazil's suggestion “that Hindus should repay America for their material success". He suggested an institution of higher learning to provide an opportunity for those studying other in other fields to learn more about Hindu traditions and teachings.

It is currently headed by Prof Kalyan Vishwanathan, a former global practice director of Tata Consultancy Services (TCS)

Academics
As of academic year 2019–2020, the university is not accredited, but states that it offers a degree authorized by the State of Florida, and has plans to secure accreditation from three different agencies.

References

External links
 Hindu University of America official website

Universities and colleges in Orlando, Florida
Educational institutions established in 1993
Hindu universities and colleges in the United States
Asian-American culture in Florida
Buildings and structures in Orange County, Florida
Indian-American culture in Florida
1993 establishments in Florida
Private universities and colleges in Florida